The Central American pygmy owl (Glaucidium griseiceps) is a species of owl in the family Strigidae. It is found in Belize, Colombia, Costa Rica, Ecuador, Guatemala, Honduras, Mexico, Nicaragua, and Panama.

Taxonomy and systematics

The International Ornithological Committee (IOC) treats the Central American pygmy owl as monotypic. However, the Clements taxonomy and Handbook of the Birds of the World recognize three subspecies, the nominate Glaucidium griseiceps, G. g. occultum, and G. g. rarum.

Description

Adults' crown and nape are grayish brown; the crown has buff to whitish spots and the nape dark "false eyes". Their upperparts and tail are rich brown and the tail has pale bars across it. Their underparts are whitish with reddish brown streaks. The juvenile's crown and nape are gray; the crown is unspotted and the nape's false eyes are sooty.

Distribution and habitat

The Central American pygmy owl is found from Veracruz, Oaxaca, and Chiapas in southern Mexico through Guatemala, Belize, Honduras, Costa Rica, and Panama into northwestern Colombia with a gap in central Nicaragua. A disjunct populations is in far northwestern Ecuador. It inhabits lowland and foothill humid tropical evergreen forest, secondary forest, semi-open areas, and mature cacao plantations.

Behavior

Feeding

Though the Central American pygmy owl is primarily nocturnal, it also often hunts in daytime. Its diet is poorly known but is thought to be large insects, other invertebrates, and small lizards, birds, and mammals.

Breeding

The Central American pygmy owl's breeding phenology is almost unknown. It has been reported to lay a clutch of two to four eggs in April and May, using a natural cavity or old woodpecker hole for the nest site.

Vocalization

The Central American pygmy owl's song "begins with 2–4 equally spaced hoots, followed by [a] very brief pause, then [a] series of 6–18 very similar notes, 'huu-huu, huu-huu-huu...'". It is sometimes preceded by trills.

Status

The IUCN has assessed the Central American pygmy owl as being of Least Concern. Its population is unknown but is believed to be stable.

References

Additional reading

König, Claus y Friedhelm Weick: Owls of the World. Christopher Helm, London 2008,

External links 

 Central American pygmy owl at the Cornell Lab of Ornithology

Central American pygmy owl
Birds of Central America
Central American pygmy owl
Taxonomy articles created by Polbot